Karen Lee Field (born in 1961 in London, England) is an author of fantasy novels for younger readers, 9- to 12-year-olds, as well as adults. She also writes short fiction.

Born in the UK, Field moved to Australia with her parents in 1969 and settled in Sydney. In 2009 she moved to the Blue Mountains in New South Wales.  She works part-time for the Australian Government, which pays the bills and allows her more time to pursue her writing career.  In 2010 she founded her own business, Kayelle Press. However, the business was shut down in 2016 due to a death in the family and having to care for her mother, who had Alzheimer's disease.

Bibliography

Novels 

 2018 Domino Effect: A Dark Novel (ebook)

Middle Grade Books

Cat and Mouse Adventures 

 TBA The House on the Hill (trade paperback) and (ebook)

The Land of Miu Series 

 3 May 2015 The Land of Miu (The Land of Miu, #1, 3rd Ed.) (ebook)

 22 May 2015 The King's Riddle (The Land of Miu, #2, 2nd Ed.) (ebook)

 1 June 2018 The Lion Gods (The Land of Miu, #3) (ebook)

Forthcoming 

 Whispering Caves - a fantasy novel for adults

Out of Print 

 2010 Cat's Eyes (Land of Miu, #1) (Kayelle Press, December 2010)
 25 Nov 2011 The Land of Miu (2nd Edition, Land of Miu, #1) – originally published with the title "Cat's Eyes"
 25 Jan 2012 The King's Riddle (Land of Miu, #2) (Kayelle Press, 2011)

Short stories 

 Where Strength Lies (Speculative Realms, July 2008)
 Amunet's Gift (100 Stories for Queensland, eMergent Publishing, May 2011)
 Boundaries (Hope Anthology, Kayelle Press, October 2011)

Forthcoming 

None at present

Articles 

 To Assess or Not to Assess, That is the Question (The Scriptorium, June 2003)

References

External links 
 The Desk of Karen Lee Field Website – Official Site
 Kayelle Press – Official Site

1960 births
21st-century Australian novelists
Australian fantasy writers
Australian publishers (people)
Australian women short story writers
Australian women novelists
Living people
21st-century Australian women writers
Women science fiction and fantasy writers
21st-century Australian short story writers